Syleter is a genus of beetles in the family Carabidae.  It contains the following species:

Species 

 Syleter andrewesi (Basilewsky, 1931)
 Syleter doriae (Putzeys, 1873)
 Syleter fulvaster (Andrewes, 1927)
 Syleter gradus Balkenohl, 2021
 Syleter malayicus (Andrewes, 1927)
 Syleter papua Darlington, 1962
 Syleter paradoxus (Putzeys, 1868)
 Syleter porphyreus (Andrewes, 1923)
 Syleter sinepunctatus Balkenohl, 2021
 Syleter validus (Andrewes, 1936)

References

Scaritinae